Todd is a male given name. The name originated from Middle English where it means "fox". Notable people and characters with the name include:

People

A–D

E–H

I–L

M–R

S–Z

Fictional characters
Todd, on Sherlock Hound
Todd, the 7 year old Tyrannosaurus in the comic strip Todd the Dinosaur 
Todd, a Wraith character in Stargate Atlantis
Todd, in the TV series Wayside
Todd Alquist, on the TV Series Breaking Bad
Todd Daring, from The Replacements
Todd Dempsy, one of the main characters from the American television sitcom Outsourced
Todd Flanders, on The Simpsons
Todd Grimshaw, played by Bruno Langley on UK soap opera Coronation Street
Todd Ianuzzi, on Beavis and Butt-head
Todd Landers, played by Kristian Schmid on Australian soap opera Neighbours
Todd Manning, from the daytime soap One Life to Live
Todd Nelson, the main character in the 1975 novel The Girl Who Owned a City
Todd Packer, a traveling sales representative portrayed by David Koechner on the American version of The Office
Dr. Todd "The Todd" Quinlan, a character on the NBC comedy series Scrubs
Todd James Rice, the alter ego of the DC Comics superhero Obsidian (comics)
Todd Chavez, on BoJack Horseman voiced by Aaron Paul
Todd Hewitt, The Knife of Never Letting Go

See also 

 Tod (given name)
 Toddy (disambiguation)

References

English-language masculine given names
English masculine given names